The Yolngu or Yolŋu ( or ) are an aggregation of Aboriginal Australian people inhabiting north-eastern Arnhem Land in the Northern Territory of Australia. Yolngu means "person" in the Yolŋu languages. The terms Murngin, Wulamba, Yalnumata, Murrgin and Yulangor were formerly used by some anthropologists for the Yolngu.

All Yolngu clans are affiliated with either the Dhuwa (also spelt Dua) or the Yirritja moiety. Prominent Dhuwa clans include the Rirratjiŋu and Gälpu clans of the Dangu people, while the Gumatj clan is the most prominent in the Yirritja moiety.

Name
The ethnonym Murrgin gained currency after its extensive use in a book by the American anthropologist W. Lloyd Warner, whose study of the Yolngu, A Black Civilization: a Social Study of an Australian Tribe (1937) quickly assumed the status of an ethnographical classic, considered by R. Lauriston Sharp the "first adequately rounded out descriptive picture of an Australian Aboriginal community." Norman Tindale was dismissive of the term, regarding it, like the term Kurnai, as "artificial", having been arbitrarily applied to a large number of peoples of northeastern Australia. The proper transliteration of the word was, in any case, Muraŋin, meaning "shovel-nosed spear folk", an expression appropriate to western peripheral tribes, such as the Rembarrnga of the general area Warner described.

For Tindale, following recent linguistic studies, the eastern Arnhem Land tribes constituting the Yolngu lacked the standard tribal structures evidenced elsewhere in Aboriginal Australia, in comprising several distinct socio-linguistic realities in an otherwise integral cultural continuum. He classified these as the Yan-nhaŋu, Djinang, Djinba, Djaŋu, Dangu, Rembarrnga, Ritharngu, Dhuwal and the Dhuwala.

Warner had deployed the term "Murngin" to denote a group of peoples who shared, in his analysis, a distinctive form of kinship organisation, describing their marriage rules, subsection system and kinship terminology. Other researchers in the field quickly contested his early findings. T. Theodor Webb argued that Warner's Murngin actually referred to one moiety, and could only denote a Yiritcha mala, and dismissed Warner's terminology as misleading. A. P. Elkin, comparing the work of Warner and Webb, endorsed the latter's analysis as more congruent with the known facts.

Wilbur Chaseling used the term "Yulengor" in the title of his 1957 work.

Since the 1960s, the term Yolŋu has been widely used by linguists, anthropologists and the Yolŋu people themselves. The term applies to both the sociocultural unit and the language dialects within it.

People
Yolngu comprise several distinct groups, differentiated by the languages and dialects they speak, but generally sharing overall similarities in the ritual life and hunter-gathering economic and cultural lifestyles in the territory of eastern Arnhem land. Early ethnographers studying the Yolngu applied the nineteenth-century concepts of tribe, horde and phratry to classify and sort into separate identities the units forming the Yolngu ethnocultural mosaic. After the work of Ian Keen in particular, such taxonomic terminology is increasingly seen as problematical, and inadequate because of its eurocentric assumptions. Specialists are undecided, for example, whether the languages spoken by the Yolngu amount to five or eight, and one survey arrived at eleven distinct "dialect" groups.

Language

Yolŋu speak a dozen languages classified under the general heading of Yolngu Matha.

Kinship system

Yolŋu groups are connected by a complex kinship system (gurruṯu). This system governs fundamental aspects of Yolŋu life, including responsibilities for ceremony and marriage rules. People are introduced to children in terms of their relation to the child ("grandmother", "uncle", etc), introducing the child to kinship from the beginning.

Yolŋu societies are generally described in terms of a division of two exogamous patrimoieties: Dhuwa and Yirritja. Each of these is represented by people of a number of different groups, each of which have their own lands, languages, totems and philosophies.

A Yirritja person must always marry a Dhuwa person (and vice versa). Children take their father's moiety, meaning that if a man or woman is Dhuwa, their mother will be Yirritja (and vice versa).

Kinship relations are also mapped onto the lands owned by the Yolŋu through their hereditary estates – so almost everything is either Yirritja or Dhuwa – every fish, stone, river, etc., belongs to one or the other moiety. For example, Yirritja yiḏaki (didgeridoos) are shorter and higher-pitched than Dhuwa yiḏaki. A few items are wakinŋu (without moiety).

The term yothu-yindi (after which the band takes its name) literally means child-big (one), and describes the special relationship between a person and their mother's moiety (the opposite to their own). Because of yothu-yindi, Yirritja have a special interest in and duty towards Dhuwa (and vice versa). For example, a Gumatj man may craft the varieties of yiḏaki associated with his own (Yirritja) clan group and the varieties associated with his mother's (Dhuwa) clan group.

The word for "selfish" or "self-centred" in the Yolŋu languages is gurrutumiriw, literally "kin lacking" or "acting as if one has no kin".

The moiety-based kinship of the Yolngu does not map in a straightforward way to the notion of the nuclear family, which makes accurate standardised reporting of households and relationships difficult, for example in the census. Polygamy is a normal part of Yolngu life: one man was known to have 29 wives, a record exceed only by polygamous arrangements among the Tiwi.

Avoidance relationships
As with nearly all Aboriginal groups, avoidance relationships exist in Yolngu culture between certain relations. The two main avoidance relationships are:
son-in-law – mother-in-law
brother – sister

Brother–sister avoidance, called mirriri, normally begins after initiation. In avoidance relationships, people do not speak directly or look at one another, and try to avoid being in too close proximity with each other.

Prominent family names
 Gurruwiwi – Gälpu clan (Dhuwa moiety, Dangu people)
 Marika – Rirratjingu clan (Dhuwa moiety, Dangu people)
 Yunupingu – Gumatj clan (Yirritja moiety)

Yolŋu culture, law and mythology

Law
The word for "law" in Yolngu is rom, and there are particular ceremonies associated with Rom, known as Rom ceremony. The complete system of Yolngu customary law is known as Ngarra, or as the Maḏayin (also written madayan and Mardiyhin). Maḏayin embodies the rights of the owners of the law, or citizens (rom watangu walal) who have the rights and responsibilities for this embodiment of law. Maḏayin includes all the people's law (rom); the instruments and objects that encode and symbolise the law (Maḏayin girri); oral dictates; names and song cycles; and the holy, restricted places (dhuyu ṉuŋgat wäŋa) that are used in the maintenance, education and development of law. Galarrwuy Yunupingu has described Rom watangu as the overarching law of the land, which is "lasting and alive... my backbone". This law covers the ownership of land and waters, the resources on or within these lands and waters. It regulates and controls production and trade and the moral, social and religious law including laws for the conservation and the farming of plants and aquatic life.

Yolŋu believe that living out their life according to Maḏayin is right and civilised. The Maḏayin creates a state of Magaya, which is a state of peace, freedom from hostilities and true justice for all.

The story of Barnumbirr (Morning Star), depicting the first death in the Dreamtime, is the beginning of Maḏayin, the cycle of life and death.

Ganma
A Deakin University study published in 2000 investigated Aboriginal knowledge systems in reaction to what the authors regarded as Western ethnocentrism in science studies. The author argues that Yolngu culture is a system of knowledge different in many ways from that of Western culture, and may be broadly described as viewing the world as a related whole rather than as a collection of objects.  The relationship between Yolngu and Western knowledge is explored by using the Yolngu idea of Ganma (Yerin in the Guringai language), which metaphorically describes two streams, one coming from the land (Yolngu knowledge) and one from the sea (Western knowledge) engulfing each other so that "the forces of the streams combine and lead to deeper understanding and truth".

Sacred objects
Raŋga is a name for sacred objects or emblems used in ceremony.

Mythology

Wangarr
The concept of Wangarr (also spelt Wanja or Waŋa) is complex. Attempts to translate the term into English have called the Wangarr beings variously "spirit man/woman", "ancestor", "totem", or various combinations. The Yolngu believe that the Wangarr ancestor-beings not only hunted, gathered food and held ceremonies as the Yolngu do today, but also that they created plants and geographical features such as rivers, rocks, sandhills and islands, and these features now incorporate the essence of the Wangarr. They also named species of plant and animal, and made these sacred to the local clan; some Wangarr took on the characteristics of a species, which then became the totem of the clan. Sacred objects and certain designs are also associated with certain Wangarr, who also gave that clan their language, law, paintings, songs, dances, ceremonies and creation stories.

In 2022 Rirratjŋu lore man Banula Marika advised choreographer Gary Lang and his NT Dance Company on a new work called Waŋa, performed in collaboration with MIKU Performing Arts and Darwin Symphony Orchestra, which shows the story of a spirit's journey after death.

Wawalag sisters

Yolŋu seasons

Yolŋu identify six distinct seasons: Miḏawarr, Dharratharramirri, Rärranhdharr, Bärra'mirri, Dhuluḏur, Mayaltha and Guṉmul.

History

Macassan contact

Yolŋu engaged in extensive trade annually with Macassan fishermen at least two centuries before contact with Europeans. They made yearly visits to harvest trepang and pearls, paying Yolŋu in kind with goods such as knives, metal, canoes, tobacco and pipes. In 1906, the South Australian Government did not renew the Macassans' permit to harvest trepang, and the disruption caused economic losses for the regional Yolŋu economy.

Yolŋu oral histories and the Djanggawul myths preserve accounts of a Baijini people, who are said to have preceded the Macassans. These Baijini have been variously interpreted by modern researchers as a different group of (presumably, Southeast Asian) visitors to Australia who may have visited Arnhem Land before the Macassans, as a mythological reflection of the experiences of some Yolŋu people who have travelled to Sulawesi with the Macassans and came back, or perhaps as traders from China.

Yolŋu also had well-established trade routes within Australia, extending to Central Australian clans and other Aboriginal countries. They did not manufacture boomerangs themselves but obtained these via trade from Central Australia. This contact was maintained through use of message sticks, as well as mailmen – with some men walking several hundred kilometres in their work to send messages and relay orders between tribes.

European contact
Yolŋu had known about Europeans before the arrival of British in Australia through their contact with Macassan traders, which probably began around the sixteenth century. Their word for European, Balanda, is derived from the Makassar language via the Malay "orang belanda" (Dutch person).

Nineteenth century
In 1883, the explorer David Lindsay was the first colonial white to penetrate Yolngu lands for the purposes of making a survey of its resources and prospects. He trekked along the Goyder River to reach the Arafura Swamp on the western fringe of Wagilak land. In 1884,  of Arnhem Land was sold by the colonial British government to cattle grazier, John Arthur Macartney. The property was called Florida Station and Macartney stocked it with cattle overlanded from Queensland. The first manager of the property, Jim Randell, bolted a swivel cannon to the verandah of the homestead to keep the Indigenous people away, while Jack Watson, the last manager of the property, reportedly "wiped out a lot" of "the blacks" living on the coast at Blue Mud Bay. During the period of Watson's management, another large massacre is recorded to have happened at Mirki on the north coast of Florida Station. The Yolngu people today remember this massacre where many people including children were shot dead. The battles between the graziers and the local population resulted in a severe depopulation of Yolngu, but the stiffness of resistance temporarily ended efforts by the intruding balanda to take over further territory, and efforts at settlement ground to a halt. Monsoonal flooding, disease and the strong resistance from the local Aboriginal population resulted in Florida Station being abandoned by Macartney in 1893.

Twentieth century
In the early 20th century, Yolngu oral history relates, punitive expeditions were launched into their territories. From 1903 to 1908, the property rights of much of Arnhem Land were held by the Eastern and African Cold Storage Supply Company. This Anglo-Australian consortium leased the region under the name of Arafura cattle station and attempted to construct a massive cattle raising and meat production industry. The company employed roving gangs of armed men to shoot the resident Aboriginal population.
The first mission to Yolngu country was set up at Milingimbi Island in 1922. The island is the traditional home of the Yan-nhaŋu. Beginning in 1932, over two years, three incidents of killing outsiders caused problems for the Yolngu.

In 1932 five Japanese trepangers were speared by Yolŋu men, in what became known as the Caledon Bay crisis. Yolngu men testified that their actions arose in response to the abuse of their women and to thrashings and firing on them by the Japanese crew. Two whites, Fagan and Traynor, were killed near Woodah Island the following year, and soon afterwards, in July, Constable McColl, who was investigating the incidents, was speared on that island. The Aboriginal evidence was ignored in the trials which led to their conviction and the imprisonment of five Yolŋu in Fannie Bay Gaol in present-day Darwin.  Only the intervention of missionaries, who had a foothold on the fringes of this area, and of the anthropologist Donald Thomson, who led a groundswell of indignation at the travesty of justice, averted an official reprisal designed to "teach the wild blacks a lesson." One sentence was quashed, three sons of a local leader were released as was Dagiar, who had received a death sentence. It was widely believed that the latter, who disappeared, had been lynched by local policemen.

Thomson lived with the Yolŋu for several years (1935-1937) and made some photographic and written records of their way of life at that time. These have become important historical documents for both Yolŋu and European Australians.

In 1935 a Methodist mission opened at Yirrkala.

In 1941, during World War II, Thomson persuaded the Australian Army to establish a Special Reconnaissance Unit (NTSRU) of Yolŋu men to help repel Japanese raids on Australia's northern coastline (classified as top secret at the time). Yolŋu made contact with Australian and US servicemen, although Thomson was keen to prevent this. Thomson relates how the soldiers would often try to obtain Yolŋu spears as mementos. These spears were vital to Yolŋu livelihood, and took several days to make and forge.

More recently, Yolngu have seen the imposition of large mines on their tribal lands at Nhulunbuy.

Yolngu in politics

Since the 1960s Yolngu leaders have been conspicuous in the struggle for Aboriginal land rights.

In 1963, provoked by a unilateral government decision to excise a part of their land for a bauxite mine, Yolngu at Yirrkala sent to the Australian House of Representatives a petition on bark. The bark petition attracted national and international attention and now hangs in Parliament House, Canberra as a testament to the Yolngu role in the birth of the land rights movement.

When the politicians demonstrated they would not change their minds, the Yolngu of Yirrkala took their grievances to the courts in 1971, in the case of Milirrpum v Nabalco Pty Ltd, or the Gove land rights case. Yolngu lost the case because Australian courts were still bound to follow the terra nullius principle, which did not allow for the recognition of any prior rights to land to Indigenous people at the time of colonisation. However, the Judge did acknowledge the claimants' ritual and economic use of the land and that they had an established system of law, paving the way for future Aboriginal Land Rights in Australia. It was said to have played a vital part in paving the way to the recognition of Aboriginal land rights in the Aboriginal Land Rights Act 1976 and the Mabo decision in 1992.

The song "Treaty", by Yothu Yindi, which became an international hit in 1989, arose as a remonstration over the tardiness of the Hawke government in enacting promises to deal with Aboriginal land rights, and made a powerful pleas for respect for Yolngu culture, territory and Law.

Yolngu arts

Yolngu artists and performers have been at the forefront of global recognition of Aboriginal and Torres Strait Islander culture. Yolngu traditional dancers and musicians have performed widely throughout the world and retain a germinal influence, through the patronage of the Munyarryun and Marika families in particular, on contemporary performance troupes such as Bangarra Dance Theatre.

Yolngu visual art

Before the emergence of the Western Desert art movement, the most well-known Aboriginal art was the Yolngu style of fine cross-hatching paintings on bark. The hollow logs (larrakitj) used in Arnhem Land burial practices serve an important spiritual purpose and are also important canvases for Yolngu art. David Malangi Daymirringu's bark depiction of Manharrnju clan mourning rites of the clan, from a private collection, was copied and featured on the original Australian one-dollar note. When the copyright violation came to light the Australian government, through the direct agency of H. C. Coombs, hastened to remunerate the artist.

Yolngu are also weavers. They weave dyed pandanus leaves into baskets. Necklaces are also made from beads made of seeds, fish vertebrae or shells. Colours are often important in determining where artwork comes from and which clan or family group created it. Some designs are the insignia of particular families and clans.

Yolngu music
The Yothu Yindi band, especially after its song "Treaty", performed the most popular indigenous music since Jimmy Little's Royal Telephone (1963) became Australia's most successful contemporary indigenous music group, and performed throughout the world. Their work has elicited serious musicological analysis.

Arnhem Land is the home of the yiḏaki, which Europeans have named the didgeridoo. Yolngu are both players and craftsmen of the yiḏaki. It can only be played by certain men, and traditionally there are strict protocols around its use.

Dr G. Yunupingu (1971–2017) was a famous Yolngu singer.

Prominent Yolngu people

 Baker Boy (Danzal Baker)
 Laurie Baymarrwangga
 George Rrurrambu Burarrwanga
 Gary Dhurrkay
 Gatjil Djerrkura
 Nathan Djerrkura
 David Gulpilil
 Djalu Gurruwiwi
 Leila Gurruwiwi
 Rarriwuy Hick
 David Malangi
 Djambawa Marawili
 Banduk Marika
 Raymattja Marika
 Roy Marika
 Wandjuk Marika
 Janet Munyarryun
 Galarrwuy Yunupingu
 Geoffrey Gurrumul Yunupingu
 Mandawuy Yunupingu

Politicians
 Yingiya Mark Guyula, Independent member for Nhulunbuy in the Northern Territory Legislative Assembly.

Films about Yolngu
 Ten Canoes
 Westwind: Djalu’s Legacy, about Djalu Gurruwiwi (there are also other films about him)
 Yolngu Boy
 High Ground

Garma festival
Every year, Yolngu come together to celebrate their culture at the Garma Festival of Traditional Cultures.  Non-Yolngu are welcome to attend the festival and learn about Yolngu traditions and Law. The Yothu Yindi Foundation oversees this festival.

Alternative names
 Murngin
 Wulamba
 Yalnumata

Sources:  ;

See also
 Gove land rights case
 Indigenous Australian food groups
 Yirrkala bark petitions
 Taboo against naming the dead
 Australian Aboriginal astronomy

Notes

Citations

Sources

Further reading

 − 12 Episodes, each with accompanying Study Guide: Whirlpool, Mermaid, Brolga, Morning Star, Namorrodor, Curse, Moon Man, Be, Spear, Wawalag (or Wagalak) sisters, Bat and the Butterfly, and Mimis.
 Twelve Canoes – video (made in collaboration with the people of Ramingining)

 PDF